The 1999 TransWorld Diversified Services Indy 200 was the first round of the 1999 Indy Racing League season. The race was held on January 24, 1999 at the  Walt Disney World Speedway in Bay Lake, Florida.

Report

Qualifying

  Restricted to just one qualifying lap after missing his original qualifying turn.
  Changed to a backup car for the race. He was put in front of the two last qualifiers, as they were using provisionals.

Failed to qualify or withdrew
 Greg Gorden R for Truscelli Team Racing - initially named for the ride, the team decided to step him down for not having enough seat time in the car, as the new chassis came just days before an scheduled test. Replaced by  Brian Tyler, who was due to drive for Team Pelfrey, where he was replaced by  Robby Unser.
 Team Menard entered the #2 car, which remained vacant for the event. Before qualifying, they announced an agreement to surrender the number #3 to Brant Racing, which were due to use #31, because of "Brant's long business relationship" with Richard Childress. Greg Ray switched numbers from #3 to #2.
 The #77 Chastain Motorsports entry, which was vacant on the entry list, did not arrive at the track.

Race

Race Statistics
Lead changes: 10 among 5 drivers

Standings after the race

Drivers' Championship standings

 Note: Only the top five positions are included for the standings.

References

External links
IndyCar official website

1999 in IndyCar
TransWorld Diversified Services Indy 200
Walt Disney World
Events at Walt Disney World